The Brockville Rifles is a Primary Reserve infantry regiment of the Canadian Army. The unit is a part of the 33 Canadian Brigade Group, 4th Canadian Division. It is fifteenth in the order of precedence of Canadian Army Infantry Regiments.

Badge

Description
A hunting horn is hung from a silver cord in the center of a gules (red) background, all of which is in a silver-bordered black ring with "The Brockville Rifles" inscribed in silver, all centered on a silver-and-black Maltese cross whose upper branch reads "Amiens" and the lower branch reads "Pursuit to Mons," both in silver. Over the cross is a crown.

Symbolism
The Maltese cross and the bugle are typical among badges of light infantry and rifle regiments. "The Brockville Rifles" is the regimental title, and "Amiens" and "Pursuit to Mons" are battle honors from the First World War. The crown represents service to the Crown.

Lineage

The Brockville Rifles 

 Originated on 5 October, 1866, in Brockville, Ontario as the 41st Brockville Battalion of Rifles
 Redesignated on 8 May, 1900, as the 41st Regiment "Brockville Rifles
 Redesignated on 12 March, 1920, as The Brockville Rifles
 Redesignated on 18 March, 1942, as the 2nd (Reserve) Battalion, The Brockville Rifles
 Converted on 1 April, 1946, to Artillery and Redesignated as the 60th Light Anti-Aircraft Regiment (Brockville Rifles), RCA
 Amalgamated on 1 September, 1954, with the 32nd Anti-Tank Battery (Self-Propelled), RCA, and Redesignated as the 32nd Locating Battery (Brockville Rifles), RCA
 Converted on 1 December, 1959, to Infantry and Redesignated as The Brockville Rifles

32nd Anti-Tank Battery (Self-Propelled), RCA 

 Originated on 14 November, 1855, in Kingston, Ontario, as the Volunteer Militia Company of Foot Artillery of Kingston
 Redesignated on 29 May, 1856, as the Volunteer Militia Field Battery of Artillery of Kingston
 Redesignated on 1 July, 1894, as the No. 5 "Kingston" Field Battery
 Redesignated on 28 December, 1895, as the 5th "Kingston" Field Battery, CA
 Redesignated on 2 February, 1920, as the 32nd (Kingston) Battery, CFA
 Redesignated on 1 July, 1925, as the 32nd (Kingston) Field Battery, CA
 Redesignated on 3 June, 1935, as the 32nd (Kingston) Field Battery, RCA
 Redesignated on 7 November, 1940, as the 32nd (Reserve) (Kingston) Field Battery, RCA
 Redesignated on 24 June, 1942, as the 3rd/32nd (Reserve) Field Battery, RCA
 Redesignated on 15 May, 1943, as the 32nd (Reserve) Anti-Aircraft Battery (Type 2H), RCA
 Redesignated on 1 September, 1943, as the 3rd/32nd (Reserve) Field Battery, RCA
 Redesignated on 1 April, 1946, as the 32nd Anti-Tank Battery (Self-Propelled), RCA
 Amalgamated on 1 September 1954, with the 60th Light Anti-Aircraft Regiment (Brockville Rifles), RCA

Lineage chart

Perpetuations
The Brockville Rifles perpetuate the Battalion of Incorporated Militia of Upper Canada; the 1st and 2nd regiments of Leeds Militia (1812–15); the 156th Battalion, CEF; and 32nd Battery, Canadian Field Artillery, CEF.

The Brockville Rifles perpetuate units dating back to 1796 with the formation of the 1st Battalion, Leeds Militia at Elizabethtown (later Brockville). At its peak, Leeds County had raised a total of nine battalions. During the War of 1812, regiments that the Brockville Rifles perpetuate were involved in the capture of Ogdensburg and the Battle of Crysler's Farm.

Operational history

Fenian Raids 
The 41st Brockville Battalion of Rifles was called out on active service from 24 May 1870 to 1 June 1870 and served on the St. Lawrence River frontier.

Great War 
The 156th Battalion (Leeds and Grenville), CEF, was authorized on 22 December 1915 and embarked for Britain on 19 October 1916, where, on 1 November 1916, the battalion's personnel were absorbed by the 109th Battalion (Victoria & Haliburton), CEF; 119th Battalion (Algoma), CEF; 120th Battalion (City of Hamilton), CEF; 123rd Battalion (Royal Grenadiers), CEF; and 124th Battalion (Governor General's Body Guard), CEF. On 27 December 1916, the battalion was reformed to provide reinforcements to the Canadian Corps in the field until being absorbed by the 6th Reserve Battalion, CEF, on 15 February 1918. The battalion was disbanded on 29 November 1918.

The 32nd Battery, CFA, CEF, was authorized on 15 August 1915 and embarked for Britain on 5 February 1916, disembarking in France on 14 July 1916, where it fought as part of the 9th Brigade, CFA, CEF, from 15 July 1916 to 1 July 1917, and subsequently with the 8th Army Brigade, CFA, in France and Flanders, from 5 July 1917 until the end of the war. The battery was disbanded on 23 October 1920.

Second World War
The regiment mobilized the 1st Battalion, The Brockville Rifles, CASF, on 18 March 1942. It served in Canada in a home defence role as part of the 13th Infantry Brigade, 6th Canadian Division, and in Jamaica on garrison duty from 5 August 1944 to 27 March 1946. The battalion was disbanded on 30 April 1946.

The regiment provided No. 2 Company of The Stormont, Dundas and Glengarry Highlanders, CASF, for active service on 24 May 1940.

The 32nd (Kingston) Field Battery, RCA, in conjunction with the 34th Field Battery, RCA, mobilized the 32nd/34th Field Battery, RCA, CASF, on 24 May 1940. This unit was reorganized as two separate batteries on 1 January 1941, designated the 32nd (Kingston) Field Battery, RCA, CASF, and the 34th Field Battery, RCA, CASF, (which was redesignated the 32nd (Kingston) Light Anti-Aircraft Battery, RCA, CASF, on the same day). It provided light anti-aircraft artillery support as part of the 4th Light Anti-Aircraft Regiment, RCA, CASF, in North-West Europe until the end of the war. The overseas battery was disbanded on 13 November 1945. The battery subsequently mobilized the 2nd/32nd Light Anti-Aircraft Battery, RCA, Canadian Army Occupation Force, on 1 June 1945, for active service with the Canadian Army Occupation Force in Germany. The battery was disbanded on 4 April 1946.

War in Afghanistan
The regiment contributed an aggregate of more than 20% of its authorized strength to the various task forces which served in Afghanistan between 2002 and 2014.

History

Early History 
The Brockville Rifles originated in Brockville, Ontario on 5 October 1866, when the 41st Brockville Battalion of Rifles was authorized with six companies located as follows: 1 Company was in Brockville, 2 Company was in Gananoque, 3 Company was in Perth, 4 Company was in Merrickville, 5 Company was in Carleton Place, and 6 Company was in Pakenham. It was designated the 41st Regiment "Brockville Rifles" on 8 May 1900; The Brockville Rifles on 12 March 1920; and the 2nd (Reserve) Battalion, The Brockville Rifles on 18 March 1942.

First World War 
On 22 December 1915, during World War I, the 156th Leeds & Grenville Battalion, Canadian Expeditionary Force, was authorized. The unit moved to England as part of the proposed 5th Canadian Division. However, a pressing need for troops and reinforcements on the front caused the disbanding of the unit; and its men were transferred to other units.

1920s–1930s 
Following World War I, the regiment was once again designated The Brockville Rifles. In April 1926, the Colonel Commandant of the King's Royal Rifle Corps invited the unit to ally with them. Today, following a series of amalgamations within the British Army, The Brockville Rifles are allied with The Rifles.

Second World War 
On 24 May 1940, during World War II, the regiment provided No. 2 Company of The Stormont, Dundas and Glengarry Highlanders, Canadian Active Service Force. On 18 March 1942, the regiment mobilized the 1st Battalion, The Brockville Rifles, into the Canadian Active Service Force. It served in Canada, in a home defence role, as part of the 13th Infantry Brigade, 6th Canadian Division, and, from 5 August 1944 to 27 March 1946, in Jamaica on garrison duty. On 30 April 1946, the battalion was disbanded. The 2nd (Reserve) Battalion served on a part-time basis in the Reserve Army at home, in Brockville.

Post War 
On 1 April 1946, The regiment (the "Brocks") was converted to artillery and redesignated the 60th Light Anti-Aircraft Regiment (Brockville Rifles), RCA. On 1 September 1954, it was amalgamated with the 32nd Anti-Tank Battery (Self-Propelled), RCA, and redesignated as the 32nd Locating Battery (Brockville Rifles), RCA. On 1 December 1959, it once again reverted to infantry and was redesignated The Brockville Rifles.

Since the end of the Second World War, Members of The Brockville Rifles have served on operations in Afghanistan, Bosnia, The Former Republic of Georgia, among other deployments. The unit prepares soldiers to be employable as effective individual augmentees to Canadian Forces operations and deployments.

Alliances 
 - The Rifles

Battle honours
In the list below, battle honours in capitals were awarded for participation in large operations and campaigns. Those in lowercase indicate those granted for more specific battles.

War of 1812
 DEFENCE OF CANADA - 1812-1815 - DÉFENSE DU CANADA
NIAGARA

First World War
ARRAS 1918
AMIENS
HINDENBURG LINE
PURSUIT TO MONS

Second World War
 Honorary distinction: the badge of the Stormont, Dundas and Glengarry Highlanders on the drums.

War in Afghanistan
Afghanistan

Recruiting
The unit recruits infantry soldiers and officers from Brockville and surrounding communities, traditionally west to Kingston and north to Kemptville and Ottawa. Basic training for the Primary Reserve is typically conducted every second weekend over a period of 6 months, during the fall and winter. Infantry soldiers must complete an 8-week qualification course at CFB Meaford. Infantry officers must complete basic training as well as two additional qualification courses at the Infantry School in CFB Gagetown, which require a further 10- and 12-week commitment.

Training
The Brocks train regularly at Canadian Armed Forces ranges and training areas, such as CFB Petawawa and CFB Kingston, as well as within Brockville, Prescott, and other local communities. Members of the unit are expected to train a minimum of one night a week and participate in one weekend exercise a month. Training consists of basic infantry soldier skills, individual battle-task standards, and more advanced training, such as urban operations and live-fire field exercises. The unit often trains with its sister unit—The Stormont, Dundas and Glengarry Highlanders—as well as participating in brigade-level training exercises with 33 Canadian Brigade Group as part of the 33 Territorial Battalion Group formation, encompassing units from across 33 CBG.

Armoury

See also

 List of armouries in Canada
 Military history of Canada
 History of the Canadian Army
 Canadian Forces

Notes

References

External links

Order of precedence

Infantry regiments of Canada
Rifle regiments
Rifle regiments of Canada
Brockville
Military units and formations of Ontario
Infantry regiments of Canada in World War II
Military units and formations established in 1866